Paola Levi-Montalcini (22 April 1909 – 29 September 2000) was an Italian painter.

Personal life
Paola Levi-Montalcini was born in Turin, Italy. Her parents, Adamo Levi and Adele Montalcini, were Sephardi Jews. She was one of four children. Her fraternal twin sister was the neurologist Rita Levi-Montalcini, who won the Nobel Prize in Medicine in 1986. Her older brother, Gino Levi-Montalcini, was an engineer and architect. She also had an older sister, Anna Maria, also known as Nina.

Career
Levi-Montalcini studied art in Turin with Felice Casorati. She made her debuted at the first edition of the Rome Quadriennale in 1931, where she exhibited a portrait of her sister Anna Maria. In 1936 she was invited to the Venice Biennale, and in 1937 she was one of the artists included in the exhibition Les Femmes Artistes d’Europe at the Galerie nationale du Jeu de Paume in Paris. Giorgio de Chirico, who was a big fan of her work, agreed to write the essay for her first monograph on her.

Thanks to the support of fellow artist and friend Marisa Mori Levi-Montalcini was able to continue living in Florence during the establishment of the Italian racial laws from 1938 to 1943. Following the end of the war, she resumed her exhibiting career with a solo show at Galleria Il Fiore in Florence.

Interested in post-Cubism, Levi-Montalcini later abandoned figuration for Concretism and by 1950 she joined the Movimento Arte Concreta. Between 1953 and 1954 she created one of her most well-known bodies of work, The Letters and the Pots. Towards the end of the 1960s she started creating kinetical and light sculptures.

Awards
1950: XXV Venice Biennale Prize
1956: Il Fiorino Prize for Graphics, Florence
1957: Morgan’s Paint Prize, Rimini, Italy
1961: Arezzo Prize, Italy

Bibliography
Giorgio de Chirico, Paola Levi Montalcini, Turin, 1939
Gillo Dorfles, Paola Levi Montalcini, Turin, 1962
Giulio Carlo Argan, Nello Ponente, Italo Mussa, Paola Levi Montalcini, Rome, 1981
Simonetta Lux (ed.), Paola Levi Montalcini: Metamorfosi, Rome, 2001

Relationships and influences 
In the late 1920s she studied under Felice Casorati.

Giorgio de Chirico wrote the first monograph on Levi-Montalcini in 1939, noting "her preferences for solid construction, large surfaces . . . and tendency to draw attention to the fantastic aspect of reality". She studied engraving with Stanley William Hayter following World War II. Hayter also trained her in automatic writing and gestural abstraction.

References 

1909 births
2000 deaths
20th-century Italian painters
20th-century Italian women artists
20th-century Italian Jews
Jewish painters
Italian twins
Painters from Turin
Modern artists
Italian women painters
Italian Sephardi Jews